Jack R. Anderson was appointed Director of Bands at the University of Pittsburgh in 1995 after serving as assistant director at Pitt for 9 years. His responsibilities include directing the Varsity Marching Band, leading the Pep Band, and conducting the Symphonic Band. As a music educator in Pennsylvania for 37 years, he has served as a guest conductor and adjudicator for PMEA throughout Western Pennsylvania.  On 10 September 2012, he announced his retirement to members of the marching band at rehearsal and in an email to band alumni, to be effective at the conclusion of the 2012–2013 academic year.

University education
Jack played in the Pitt Band in the late 1960s and early 1970s and holds a Bachelor of Arts degree from the University of Pittsburgh and a Master’s of Education degree from Edinboro University of Pennsylvania.

Membership
Anderson is a member of many professional organizations including the College Band Directors National Association, Big East Band Directors Association, Music Educators National Conference, Pennsylvania Music Educators Association, and the following honoraries: Omicron Delta Kappa, Kappa Kappa Psi, Tau Beta Sigma, Mu Kappa Upsilon, and Iota Beta Kappa.

Distinguishments
In 2007, Anderson was awarded the Distinguished Service to Music Medal for marching band, the highest national award presented by Kappa Kappa Psi, National Honorary Band Fraternity. He also was awarded the “Professor of the Year Award” in 2006 and 2007 for outstanding teaching from Pitt’s Fraternity and Sorority Life, a part of the Division of Student Affairs. In addition to these prestigious awards, he has received the Paula Crider Outstanding Band Director Award, presented annually by Tau Beta Sigma, National Honorary Band Sorority, to a college band or university band director who distinguishes himself in the field of university bands; “Outstanding Leader on Campus Award,” presented by the Student Government Board at Pitt; and a “Special Recognition Award,” given by the Mon Valley Chapter of the Panther Club for his dedicated service to Pitt athletics.

Personal life
Jack and his wife Peggy met while in the Pitt Band as undergraduates, and they live in Scott Township. They have two daughters, Katie Culp and Carrie Fisher, both alumni of the Pitt Band. They are also the grandparents of Anderson, Jake and Molly, children of Carrie and Michael.

References

Year of birth missing (living people)
Living people
University of Pittsburgh alumni
University of Pittsburgh faculty
American music educators
American conductors (music)
American male conductors (music)
University and college band directors
American bandleaders
Edinboro University of Pennsylvania alumni
Distinguished Service to Music Medal recipients